Veikko Honkanen (6 September 1908, in Varpaisjärvi – 15 September 1999) was a Finnish politician. He served as a member of the Parliament of Finland from 1962 to 1966 and again from 1967 to 1970, representing the Agrarian League, in 1965 renamed the Centre Party.

References

1908 births
1999 deaths
People from Lapinlahti
People from Kuopio Province (Grand Duchy of Finland)
Centre Party (Finland) politicians
Members of the Parliament of Finland (1962–66)
Members of the Parliament of Finland (1966–70)